Reginald Jones was a professional rugby league footballer who played in the 1920s and 1930s.

Challenge Cup Final appearances 
Reginald Jones played , in Oldham's 26-7 victory over Swinton in the 1926–27 Challenge Cup Final during the 1926–27 season at Central Park, Wigan on Saturday 7 May 1927, in front of a crowd of 33,448.

References

External links
Search for "Jones" at rugbyleagueproject.org
Search for "Reginald Jones" at britishnewspaperarchive.co.uk
Search for "Reg Jones" at britishnewspaperarchive.co.uk

English rugby league players
Oldham R.L.F.C. players
Place of birth missing
Place of death missing
Rugby league halfbacks
Year of birth missing
Year of death missing